Phyllidiopsis bayi is a species of sea slug, a dorid nudibranch, a shell-less marine gastropod mollusk in the family Phyllidiidae.

Distribution 
This species was described from the Red Sea. It is endemic to the southern Red Sea and the Gulf of Aden.

Description
This nudibranch has a translucent white dorsum with black lines creating a central ring with lines running off at right angles to the margin. At the margin they widen slightly, giving the appearance of cut-off circular patches of white. It is a small Phyllidiid, growing to 20 mm in length.

Diet
This species feeds on a sponge.

References

Phyllidiidae
Gastropods described in 1912